Immanuel High School is a Christian high school located in Reedley, California. The school is a private Christian school that serves Fresno County and Tulare County. It is one of the Immanuel Schools.

Athletics

The school's mascot is the Eagle. The IHS school colors are Spotless White, Red and Royal Blue. Immanuel High School participates in sports as a Division IV school in the CIF Central Section and plays in the Central Sequoia League (CSL) except in Football where they are independent. They have won many CIF Div. IV & V Valley Championships and a few State Championships. The sports at IHS include:

External links
 immanuelschools.com Immanuel High School Eagles

High schools in Fresno County, California
Private high schools in California
1944 establishments in California